The Cheyenne Veterans Administration Hospital Historic District, at 2360 Pershing Blvd. in Cheyenne, Wyoming, is a  historic district which was listed on the National Register of Historic Places in 2013.  The listing included 15 contributing buildings, a contributing structure, and a contributing object.

Its main building, built in 1932, at the center of the complex, faces south, and includes Mission Revival and Spanish Colonial Revival styles.  It is brick-clad, with tapestry brick laid in five-course American bond, and is topped by roofs clad in Spanish tiles.

It was listed in conformance with a 2011 study of veterans hospitals nationwide.

References

External links

Historic districts on the National Register of Historic Places in Wyoming
National Register of Historic Places in Laramie County, Wyoming
Mission Revival architecture in Wyoming